Assan is a village in Rohtak district of Haryana, India. District elementary education officer Rohtak has set up a High School in the village. It is 17 km away from the main district Rohtak. Temple of Dadi Badha is the centre of attraction in the village, Mela (festival) is celebrated every year.

There is two Government schools, one is of girls and other is of boys.

References

Villages in Rohtak district